T. Roth and Another Pretty Face is an American glam rock band.

Description
T. Roth and Another Pretty Face was founded by lead singer and songwriter Terry Roth in New York in the early 1970s.  One of the original band members was Bon Jovi drummer Tico Torres.

The band recorded their first album in 1974 entitled 21st Century Rock, produced by Ed Stasium, and RCA did not release it and shelved the album.

T. Roth and Another Pretty Face recorded their next album in the late 1970s, again with future Ramones producer Ed Stasium, entitled Face Facts that was released in 1980 by Reflection Records.

In 2011, T. Roth and Another Pretty Face released a new album entitled Still Pretty?

Terry Roth also performs on YouTube under the name Zipster.

Discography
21st Century Rock (1974)
Face Facts (1980)
Still Pretty? (2011)

References

External links

Rock music groups from New York (state)
American glam rock musical groups
Musical groups established in the 1970s
American YouTubers